The following list comprises the physiogeographic regions of the Canadian province of British Columbia as defined by S.S. Holland in Bulletin 48 of the Ministry of Energy, Mines and Petroleum Resources' Landforms of British Columbia.

Western Cordillera (Canadian Cordillera)

Western System

Outer Mountain Area
Saint Elias Mountains
Fairweather Range
Duke Depression
Alsek Ranges
Icefield Ranges
Insular Mountains
Queen Charlotte Mountains
Skidegate Plateau
Queen Charlotte Ranges
Vancouver Island Mountains
Vancouver Island Ranges
Alberni Basin
Estevan Lowland (aka Estevan Strandflat)

Coastal Trough
Hecate Depression
Queen Charlotte Lowland
Argonaut Plain
Nahwitti Lowland
Suquash Basin
Hecate Lowland
Milbanke Strandflat
Georgia Depression
Georgia Lowland
Fraser Lowland
Nanaimo Lowland

Coast Mountain Area
Coast Mountains
Boundary Ranges
Kitimat Ranges
Fiord Ranges - Geophysical Survey of Canada designation for the Kitimat Ranges, plus the lower portion of the Pacific Ranges between the icefield-massifs at the core of the range and the coast.  The latter are sometimes labelled the Front Ranges on some topographic maps but are not in evidence on modern versions.
Pacific Ranges
Chilcotin Ranges
Cascade Mountains
Coquihalla Range
Skagit Range
Hozameen Range
Okanagan Range

Interior System

Northern Plateau and Mountain Area
Yukon Plateau
Tagish Highland
Teslin Plateau
Nisutlin Plateau
Liard Plain

Central Plateau and Mountain Area (Interior Mountains)
Stikine Plateau
Tahltan Highland
Taku Plateau
Kawdy Plateau
Atsutla Range
Nahlin Plateau
Tanzilla Plateau
Klastline Plateau
Spatsizi Plateau
Skeena Mountains
Kippan Range
Tatlatui Range
Eaglenest Range
Sicintine Range
Slamgeesh Range
Nass Basin (Nass Depression)
Hazelton Mountains
Nass Ranges
Kispiox Range
Bulkley Ranges
Tahtsa Ranges
Cassiar Mountains
Dease Plateau
Horseranch Range
Stikine Ranges
Kechika Ranges
Sifton Ranges
Omineca Mountains
Swannell Ranges
Finlay Ranges
Hogem Ranges

Rocky Mountain Trench

Southern Plateau and Mountain Area
Interior Plateau
Fraser Basin
Nechako Plain
Nechako Plateau
McGregor Plateau
Fraser Plateau
Cariboo Plateau
Chilcotin Plateau
Thompson Plateau
Quesnel Highland
Shuswap Highland
Okanagan Highland
Columbia Mountains
Cariboo Mountains
Monashee Mountains
Selkirk Mountains
Purcell Mountains

Eastern System

Mackenzie Mountain Area
Liard Plateau

Rocky Mountain Area
Rocky Mountains
Border Ranges
Galton Range
MacDonald Range
Clarke Range
Continental Ranges
Front Ranges
Kootenay Ranges
Park Ranges
Hart Ranges
Misinchinka Ranges
Muskwa Ranges
Rabbit Platuea
Rocky Mountain Foothills

Interior Plains

Alberta Plateau

Fort Nelson Lowland

References

British Columbia geography-related lists